Hinduism was introduced to Yemen by immigrant Indian and Nepalese workers. Hinduism in Yemen largely goes under the radar, and is only practiced by small congregations scattered around the country. An estimated 150,000 Hindus resided in Yemen in 2010. That number increased to 200,000 (or 0.7% of the population) in 2020.

Temples 
The famous Hindu temples in Yemen include the Shri Tarichmerga Temple that was built in 1862. Shri Ram Ji Temple built in 1875 and the Hanuman Temple built in 1882, according to an IANS report in 2013. The Indian Association in Aden manages the Mataji Temple and regular services are held once a month. There is also a separate crematorium in Aden for the members of the Hindu faith.

Demographics

The Pew Research data reports that the Hindu population is expected to increase from 0.7% in 2020 to 0.8% by 2050.

See also 

 Hinduism in Arab states
 Religion in Yemen

References

External links 

 

Yemen
Yemen
Hinduism in the Arab world
Religion in Yemen